Chiara Boggiatto (born 17 February 1986 in Moncalieri, Turin) is an Italian breaststroke swimmer. She was several times finalist in European and World Championship swimming 200 m breaststroke and relays. She participated for Italy at the 2004 Summer Olympics in Athens, Greece and the 2012 Summer Olympics in London, Great Britain.

She is a sibling of Alessio Boggiatto, a world class medley swimmer.

See also
 Swimming at the 2004 Summer Olympics – Women's 100 metre breaststroke
 Swimming at the 2004 Summer Olympics – Women's 200 metre breaststroke
 Swimming at the 2004 Summer Olympics – Women's 4 × 100 metre medley relay
 European SC Championships 2003
 European SC Championships 2005

References

 
  
 Chiara Boggiatto on nuotopedia.eu

External links 
 

1986 births
Living people
People from Moncalieri
Olympic swimmers of Italy
Swimmers at the 2004 Summer Olympics
Swimmers at the 2012 Summer Olympics
European Aquatics Championships medalists in swimming
Mediterranean Games gold medalists for Italy
Swimmers at the 2001 Mediterranean Games
Universiade medalists in swimming
Mediterranean Games medalists in swimming
Universiade gold medalists for Italy
Medalists at the 2009 Summer Universiade
Italian female breaststroke swimmers
Sportspeople from the Metropolitan City of Turin
21st-century Italian women